Looking for Lucky is the fifth studio album by American rock band Hootie & the Blowfish, released on August 9, 2005. The album sold 128,000 copies in the U.S. up to March 2009.

Track listing
"State Your Peace" – 3:37
"Hey Sister Pretty" – 3:25
"The Killing Stone" – 4:27
"Get Out of My Mind" – 2:58
"Another Year's Gone By" – 3:44
"Can I See You" – 3:38
"A Smile" – 3:49
"One Love" – 4:06
"Leaving" – 2:35
"Autumn Jones" – 3:27
"Free to Everyone" – 3:23
"Waltz into Me" – 3:13

Personnel
Hootie & the Blowfish
Mark Bryan – background vocals, group member, guitar, lap steel guitar, mandolin
Dean Felber – background vocals, bass guitar, group member
Darius Rucker – background vocals, lead vocals, group member
Jim Sonefeld – background vocals, drums, group member, percussion, piano

Other musicians
Matraca Berg – background vocals
Sam Bush – fiddle, mandolin, vocal harmony
John Cowan – vocal harmony 
John Hobbs – Mellotron, organ, piano 
Steve Nathan – organ
Ryan Newell – slide guitar

Production
Georgette Cartwright – Creative services coordinator 
Mark Dearnley – Engineer, mixing
Robin Geary – Hair stylist, make-up
Don Gehman – Mixing, producer
Greg Lawrence – Assistant
Bob Ludwig – Mastering
Shannon Shepherd – Stylist
Ann Smalley – Cover design 
Mark Tucker – Cover design, photography 
Amy L. VonHolzhausen – Cover design, creative director

References

External links
Hootie and the Blowfish Get Lucky story at Rolling Stone

2005 albums
Hootie & the Blowfish albums
Vanguard Records albums
Albums produced by Don Gehman